Arthur Charles Erickson     (June 14, 1924 – May 20, 2009) was a Canadian architect and urban planner. He studied Engineering at the University of British Columbia and, in 1950, received his B.Arch. (Honours) from McGill University. He is known as Canada's most influential architect and was the only Canadian architect to win the American Institute of Architects AIA Gold Medal (in 1986, for the Embassy of Canada, Washington, D.C.). When told of Erickson's award, Philip Johnson said, "Arthur Erickson is by far the greatest architect in Canada, and he may be the greatest on this continent."

Early life and education
Erickson was born in Vancouver, British Columbia on June 14, 1924. The son of Oscar Erickson and Myrtle Chatterson, he had an early interest, and talent for, painting and horticulture. As had his father, Erickson served in the Canadian Army, enlisting with the Canadian Army Intelligence Corps during World War II and serving in India, British Ceylon, and Malaysia.

Erickson’s original intention was to go into the Diplomatic corps; he changed his mind when he saw the work of Frank Lloyd Wright. His post-secondary studies included an undergraduate degree at the University of British Columbia, followed by the McGill University School of Architecture. After graduating from McGill in 1950, Erickson was granted a travel scholarship and traveled around the Mediterranean, studying climate and style in their relationship to architecture. He spent ten years teaching at the University of Oregon and the University of British Columbia, during which time he designed some of British Columbia's most important houses--Canadian Homes Magazine called his 1959 Filberg House "Canada's most fabulous house". Erickson spent a few years at Thompson Berwick and Pratt and Partners then, in 1962, founded Erickson/Massey Architects with Geoffrey Massey. In 1963, Erickson and Massey submitted the winning design for Simon Fraser University.

Style and method 
Erickson's early buildings were often modernist concrete or wooden structures designed to respond to the natural conditions of their locations, especially climate. Erickson always integrated light and water features into his designs, along with the characteristic horizontal elements and terraces that came from the vernacular architecture of the Far East. Many buildings, such as the Museum of Anthropology in Vancouver, were inspired by the post and beam architecture of the Coastal First Nations, Asian temples and the North American log cabin. Erickson is also known for numerous futuristic designs such as the Fresno City Hall, the UCI School of Biological Sciences and the 1967 Catton House, also known as the 'Starship House'. His work balanced the style of modernism with an integration of the surrounding natural environment. Erickson constantly stressed the importance of greenery and water in all of his designs—as a teacher, he impressed this upon his students by making them draw blades of grass. He insisted on bringing in a landscape architect at the outset of all of his projects and, for most of his projects, worked with the landscape architect Cornelia Oberlander.

Significant works

Simon Fraser University (Burnaby, BC) 

Simon Fraser University is located on top of Burnaby Mountain, at Greater Vancouver's eastern edge, 1,214 feet above sea level. The scale of the project is reminiscent of utopian designs from French architects in the late eighteenth century such as Etienne-Louis Bouillee, and provides a balance between the British Columbia context and the structural ambitions of the 1960s period of Modern architecture. The unfinished concrete blends in with the surrounding geography in colour but not in shape. When viewed from above in plan, the campus forms a geometric contrast to the snowy mountains of its context but does not interfere with the site's spectacular views and is open to its natural surroundings. While Erickson had 900 acres on which to build, he kept the campus tight and left the rest for meadow and playing fields. The design features a covered plaza with massive skylights which respond to Vancouver’s wet climate. The campus is landscaped to provide numerous small spaces for study; it in centre, Erickson placed a large rectangular pool containing an enormous block of Fraser River jade. Perhaps most significantly, academic disciplines are not isolated in separate buildings; the campus is a quadrangle designed so that people have to cross paths and interact with each other. The design was met with international acclaim, with one critic writing that it "answered questions about the nature of education".

Museum of Anthropology at the University of British Columbia (Vancouver, BC) 

The Museum of Anthropology was built in 1976, as an inclusion to the campus at the University of British Columbia. It houses artifacts and exhibits from world cultures, with an emphasis on Pacific Northwest cultures and the First Nations of British Columbia.  This building blends methods of reinforced concrete and the traditional post-and-beam construction to articulate the structure. Oversized beams evoke a monumental feeling in many of Erickson's projects, calling on the size and scale of the trees found in the surrounding context. It is well known for Erickson’s use of concrete piers and large stretches of glass. By using concrete beams to represent de-materialized logs and opening up the main atrium through expanses of glass, Erickson refers to the traditional notion of post-and-beam construction while integrating these characteristics into a modernist building. The structure sits on a promontory facing the ocean and mountains. The landscape of the site was particularly important, as Erickson wanted to depict the connection between indigenous Pacific Northwest cultures to the land. He and Oberlander studied the landscapes of Haida Gwaii, with its totem poles standing on mounds covered with wild grasses and surrounded by forest. A seed expert provided the correct plantings of indigenous grasses and flowers, fallen logs were left in situ, a gravel pond was created to reflect the mountains and sky, and mounds of earth were used to both muffle traffic and create the sense of hills rolling to the ocean. The university describes the museum as: ..."a total work of art, expressing a convergence of the site, building, collection and the performances and ceremonies that take place there."

Robson Square (Vancouver, BC) 

Built in Vancouver in 1979 as a large civic center, Erickson’s design included waterfalls, a roof garden, several plazas, and stairs with ramps integrated within. This complex is one of the few in North America that integrates everything from public space and landscape to a set of surrounding buildings, spanning from the art gallery to the law courts. As time goes on, more additions are being created that seem to contrast the original intent of the design. Glass barriers were installed near the waterfall, preventing people from getting close to it, as well as on the edges of planters to prevent people from being able to sit on them. It has also since lost the outdoor restaurants, cinema, and large auditorium that once existed on the site. On the design of the roof garden, Erickson was assisted by his former student, architect Bing Thom; the landscape architect on Robson Square was Cornelia Oberlander.

Roy Thomson Hall (Toronto, ON) 
Designed and built in the city of Toronto, Roy Thomson Hall was not designed to blend into its surroundings in order to be recognized as a landmark and home to the Toronto Symphony Orchestra. Characteristic of Erickson's other designs with additions of water and other natural elements, this project includes a water feature of pond and rocks adjacent the building. Due to its placement below-grade, it can go unnoticed to pedestrians walking by. The interior of the building was designed by Erickson's life partner Francisco Kipacz, the only Canadian published as "Designer of the Year" by the American Press Institute. The interior used a colour palette of grey and silver to harmonize with the concrete structure and create a peaceful atmosphere. This interior has since been retrofitted by the firm KPMB Architects, adding wood planking as well as purple and plum seating throughout the hall in attempt to make the atmosphere warmer.

Canadian Chancery (Washington, DC) 

The personal selection of Arthur Erickson as the architect for the Canadian Chancery in Washington, DC by then-Prime Minister Pierre Trudeau was controversial, because Trudeau and Erickson were close friends and the Prime Minister overruled the objections and choices of the embassy's design committee. Erickson's biographer Nicholas Olsberg described the building as "making fun of the ridiculous terms to which buildings must adhere in Washington... mocking the US and all of its imperial pretensions." In fact, Erickson had to obey his client's instructions, which were to express neighbourliness, openness and friendship, while adhering to the restrictions put in place by the 20 committees which regulate what happens on Pennsylvania Avenue. He blended the Neoclassicism of existing structures with the idiom of the Plantation house to create an expanse of space. Oberlander landscaped the courtyard with northern plants; Erickson had Haida artist Bill Reid create the massive sculpture Spirit of Haida Gwaii, the Black Canoe, which sits in the courtyard in a pool of water. While his detractors may have had initial doubts about his ability to create a structure which represented Canada, it is this building which won Erickson the AIA Gold Medal.

Museum of Glass (Tacoma, WA) 
This museum was built in the city of Tacoma, Washington, as part of an initiative to revitalize the waterfront which was one of the most polluted industrial areas in Washington in the past. Erickson's design for the museum features a 90-foot-tall metal cone erupting from a structure of steel and concrete. The enormous cone acts as a 'chimney' for the museum's amphitheater, where visitors can overlook visiting artists as they create glass art. Large public art displays and concrete plazas overlook the neighbouring waterway, while pools of water interlaced with stairs and switchback ramps to connect each levels. The museum aims to connect the downtown core to the city's waterfront as well, through a 150-foot long bridge named the Chihuly Bridge of Glass. The bridge is named after Tacoma native Dale Chihuly, who was a pioneer of the Studio Glass Movement and has many works on display at the museum.

Works (by year completed)

Killam-Massey House, West Vancouver, BC (1955)
McKeen Beach House, Qualicum Beach, BC (1955)
Filberg House, Comox, BC (1958)
Boultbee House, Vancouver, BC (1960)
Dyde House, Edmonton, AB (1960)
Graham House, West Vancouver, BC (1962)
Point Grey Town Homes, Vancouver, BC (1963)
MacMillan Bloedel Building, Vancouver, BC (1965) (Re-named Arthur Erickson Place 2021.)
Canadian Pavilion, International Trade Fair, Tokyo, Japan (1965)
Baldwin House, Burnaby, BC (1965)
Smith House, West Vancouver, BC (1965)
Simon Fraser University, Burnaby, BC (1965 onward, in stages)
Man in the Community Pavilion, Expo 67, Montreal, QC (1967)
Canadian Pavilion, Expo 67, Montreal, QC (1967), consulting architect
Craig House, Kelowna, BC (1967)
Catton House (aka Starship House), West Vancouver, BC (1967), with Geoffrey Massey
Hi-View Estates Port Moody, BC (1968)
Government of Canada pavilion, Expo '70, Osaka, Japan (1970)
Ross Street Sikh Temple, Vancouver, BC (1970)
Shannon Mews, Vancouver, BC (1971)
University Hall, University of Lethbridge, Lethbridge, AB (1971)
Helmut Eppich House, West Vancouver, BC (1972)
Champlain Heights Elementary School, Vancouver, BC (1973)
Hilborn House, Cambridge, Ontario, ON (1974)
Museum of Anthropology at UBC, University of British Columbia, Vancouver, BC (1976)
Habitat Pavilion, Habitat I, United Nations Conference on Human Settlements, Vancouver, BC (1976)
Fire Island House, Fire Island, NY (1977)
Bagley Wright House, Seattle, WA (1977)
Hollenberg House, Bad Homburg, Germany (1978)
Keevil Beach House, Savary Island, BC (1978)
Eglinton West Subway Station, Toronto, ON (1978), with Clifford & Lawrie
Yorkdale Subway Station, Toronto, ON (1978)
Evergreen Building, Vancouver, BC (1978)
Robson Square, Provincial Law Courts, and Vancouver Art Gallery, Vancouver, BC (1978-1983) 
Montiverdi Estates, West Vancouver, BC (1979)
Hugo Eppich House, West Vancouver, BC (1979)
Bank of Canada Building addition, Ottawa, ON (1979), with Marani Rounthwaite & Dick
Hwang House, Vancouver, BC (1982)
Roy Thomson Hall, Toronto, ON (1982)
Napp Research Centre, Cambridge, UK (1983)
Robert McLaughlin Gallery expansion, Oshawa, ON (1984) 
One California Plaza at Bunker Hill, Los Angeles, CA (1985) (Also master plan for Bunker Hill)
Gilbert Biological Sciences Building, Stanford University, Stanford, CA (1985)
King's Landing, Toronto, ON (1985), with Cowle and Martin
Red Deer Polytechnic Arts Centre, Red Deer, Alberta, AB (1986)
Vinod Khosla House, Portola Valley, California (1986)
Etisalat Tower I, Dubai, United Arab Emirates (1986)
Russell House, Tacoma, Washington, WA (1986)
Admiralty Place Housing, Dartmouth, NS (1987), with Cowle and Martin
Stein Institute for Research on Aging, University of California, San Diego, CA (1987)
Dalhousie University Law Library addition, Halifax, NS (1988)
Balboa Beach House, Newport Beach, California, CA (1988)
Government of Ontario Building, Thunder Bay ON (1989), with Reginald Nalezyty Architect
Canadian Chancery, Washington, DC (1989)
Markham Civic Centre, Markham, Ontario, ON (1989), with Richard Stevens Architects
Convention Center, San Diego, CA (1989)
The Kingbridge Centre, King City, Ontario, ON (1989)
Inn at Laurel Point addition, Victoria, British Columbia, BC (1989)
Saskatoon City Hospital, Saskatoon, SK (1990)
Kaiser Permanente Baldwin Park Medical Center, Baldwin Park, CA (1991), with HMC Architects
Fresno City Hall, Fresno, California, CA (1991)
McGaugh Hall, University of California, Irvine, CA (1991)
Two California Plaza at Bunker Hill, Los Angeles, CA (1992) (Also master plan for Bunker Hill)
Walter C. Koerner Library, University of British Columbia, Vancouver, BC (1997)
Bruce Dunbar Maui House, Makena, Hawaii, HI (1998)
Portland Hotel, Vancouver, BC (2000)
Liu Institute for Global Issues, Vancouver, BC (2000)
Waterfall Building, Vancouver, BC (2001)
Choklit Townhomes, Vancouver, BC (2004)
Oil Sector Complex, Kuwait City, Kuwait (2005)
Weihai Culture & Arts Center, Weihai, China (2005), with Nick Milkovich Architects, Architects of Record: Shanghai Universal Architectural Design
RCMP Heritage Centre, Regina, Saskatchewan, SK (2007)
Museum of Glass, Tacoma, WA (2002)
Canada House, Vancouver, BC (2009)
The Erickson, Vancouver, BC (2010)
McLelland Hall, University of Arizona at Tucson, AZ (2015), designed 1988 with NBBJ-Gresham Larson, completed by Gould Evans
Paradox Hotel Vancouver (2016), designed 2005; completed by Musson Cattell Mackey and dys architecture)

Arthur Erickson divided the archives of his work among several Canadian repositories. The Canadian Architecture Collection of McGill University holds his Middle East projects from 1975-1997, as well as other architectural drawings and biographical and professional papers from pre-1950 to 1987. The Canadian Architectural Archives at the University of Calgary hold material that covers the 1963–1970 years.  The Canadian Centre for Architecture fonds documents his work from 1947-2002.

Awards

 1958 Massey Medal, Silver Medal for Killam-Massey Residence, West Vancouver; B.C
 1967 Centennial Design Award, National Housing Design Council
 1967 Molson Prize, awarded by Canada Council for the Arts
 1967 Massey Medal for the design of Smith House, West Vancouver, BC
 1967 Massey Medal for the design of Simon Fraser University, Burnaby, BC
 1967 Massey Medal for the design of the Canadian Pavilion for the International Trade Fair, Tokyo, Japan
 1968 Award of Merit, Canadian Architect
 1969 Award for the design of Lam House Architectural Record
 1970 Massey Medal for the design of the MacMillan Bloedel Building, Vancouver, BC
 1970 Massey Medal for the design of the Canadian Pavilion at Expo '70, Osaka, Japan
 1970 Triangle Award of the National Society of Interior Designers for the Canadian Pavilion at Expo 70, Osaka, Japan
 1970 Award for Best Pavilion at Expo '70, Architectural Institute of Japan, 1970
 1970 Award of Excellence, Canadian Architect
 1971 Award, Centre du Plateau Beaubourg (Pompidou Centre), Paris, Cultural Centre Competition
 1971 Royal Bank of Canada Award, for outstanding contributions to human welfare and common good
 1973 Officer of the Order of Canada
 1973 Gold Medal in Architecture and the Allied Arts, Tau Sigma Delta Honor Society
 1974 Auguste Perret Award, International Union of Architects
 1975 Auguste Perret Award for general excellence in design at the International Union of Architects Congress
 1979 President’s Award of Excellence for Robson Square, American Society of Landscape Architects
 1980 RAIC Festival of Architecture Honour Award (6), for the designs of Robson Square and the Provincial Law Courts, Eppich Residence, the Museum of Anthropology, Habitat Pavilion, Sikh Temple and Champlain Heights Community School, Vancouver, BC.
 1981 Companion of the Order of Canada
 1982 Governor General’s Award for Architecture (formerly Massey Medal) for Robson Square Complex
 1982 Governor General’s Award for Architecture for Yorkdale Transit System
 1983 Governor General’s Award for Architecture for the Museum of Anthropology
 1984 Gold Medal for Outstanding Architect, Royal Architectural Institute of Canada
 1984 First Chicago Architecture Award (with Philip Johnson)
 1984 Gold Medal, French Academy of Architecture
 1986 Gold Medal, American Institute of Architects (AIA)
 Honorary Fellow of the Collegio d’Architectura d’Espana, 1987
 Honorary Fellow of the Royal Incorporation of Architects in Scotland, 1988
 Honorary Fellow of the Collegio d’Architectura de Mexico, 1993
 2001 Honorary Fellow of the Royal Institute of British Architects
 2002 Medal for the design of the Waterfall Building, Architectural Institute of British Columbia, (with Nick Milkovich Architects Inc.)
 2003 Medal for the design of the Museum of Glass, Architectural Institute of British Columbia, (with Nick Milkovich Architects Inc.)
 2004 Design Arts Award, Vancouver Arts Awards
 2007 Premier’s Award of Excellence in Architecture for RCMP Heritage Centre
 2007 RAIC Prix du XXe siecle award for Simon Fraser University
 2007 RAIC Prix du XXe siecle award for Smith House
 2010 Urban Development Institute Award for “The Erickson” (with Nick Milkovich Architects Inc.)
 2011 RAIC Prix du XXe siecle award for Museum of Anthropology
 2011 RAIC Prix du XXe siecle award for Robson Square
 2017 International Property Awards Best International Hotel Architecture, for Trump International Hotel and Tower, Vancouver (Originally Ritz-Carlton Hotel)

Honorary university degrees
 D.Eng. (Honoris Causa), Technical University of Nova Scotia, 1973
 LL.D. (Honoris Causa), Simon Fraser University, 1973
 LL.D. (Honoris Causa), McGill University, 1975
 LL.D. (Honoris Causa), University of Manitoba, 1978
 LL.D. (Honoris Causa), University of Lethbridge, 1981
 D.Lit. (Honoris Causa), University of British Columbia, 1985
 D.Lit. (Honoris Causa), Lakehead University, 1988
 M.Arch., The School of Architecture at Taliesin, 2001

Reputation, influences and legacy 
Erickson was the mentor of many other noted local architects and urbanists, including founding members of many of Vancouver's premier design-oriented architectural firms. His buildings were also the subject of paintings by artists including Vancouver-based Tiko Kerr.

In 1971, he received the Royal Bank Award. In 1973, he was made an Officer of the Order of Canada and was promoted to Companion in 1981. Erickson received the Chicago Architectural Award in 1984 alongside Philip Johnson and Joan Burgee. In 1986, he received the AIA Gold Medal, making him the first ever Canadian architect to receive this award.

Erickson lived in Point Grey with his life partner and interior design collaborator, Francisco Kripacz. He died in Vancouver on May 20, 2009. His legacy still lives on through the Arthur Erickson Foundation. The foundation has been registered in the province of British Columbia since 1993 as a non-profit charitable society. Founded originally as the Arthur Erickson House and Garden Foundation in 1993, the organization was created by Erickson's neighbour and fellow landscape architect Elizabeth Watts in order to raise money to buy Erickson's Point Grey home after he went bankrupt. The society succeeded and became owner of the Point Grey residence in Vancouver, BC. After his death, the foundation was expanded to offer education, research, and work in preservation with stewardship, education, and tours offered to keep people informed about the legacy of one of Canada's first internationally acclaimed architects.

See also
 McGill School of Architecture
 Distinguished Canadian Planners

References

Further reading

External links

 
 Historic Places in Canada
 The Macmillan Bloedel Building (1965) Vancouver
 Provincial Law Courts Vancouver (1973), Interior Concourse View
 Arthur Erickson archive at the Canadian Centre for Architecture
 Mercer, Katie & Chan, Cheryl. "B.C. architect Arthur Erickson dead at 84," The Province (Vancouver), Thursday, May 21, 2009.
 Sinoski, Kelly. "Renowned architect Arthur Erickson dead at 84," The Vancouver Sun, Thursday, May 21, 2009.
 Nick Milkovich Architects Inc.
Arthur Erickson Digital Archive from the John Bland Canadian Architecture Collection

1924 births
2009 deaths
 
Artists from Vancouver
Canadian architects
Canadian urban planners
Companions of the Order of Canada
Canadian gay artists
McGill School of Architecture alumni
Modernist architecture in Canada
Modernist architects
University of British Columbia alumni
Academic staff of the University of British Columbia
LGBT architects
20th-century Canadian LGBT people
21st-century Canadian LGBT people
Recipients of the AIA Gold Medal